Emil Johannes Collan (21 May 1882 – 22 December 1948) was a Finnish sport shooter who competed in the 1912 Summer Olympics.

He was born in Savonlinna and died in Pohja. In 1912 he was part of the Finnish team which finished fifth in the team clay pigeons event. In the individual trap competition he finished 29th.

References

1882 births
1948 deaths
People from Savonlinna
People from Mikkeli Province (Grand Duchy of Finland)
Finnish male sport shooters
Trap and double trap shooters
Olympic shooters of Finland
Shooters at the 1912 Summer Olympics
Sportspeople from South Savo